Alexander Mikhaylovich Puzanov (– 1 March 1998) was a Soviet-Russian statesman who was from 1952 to 1956 the Chairman of the Council of Ministers of the Russian SFSR, literally meaning Premier or Prime Minister. 

Puzanov also had a diplomatic career. He served as the Ambassador of the Soviet Union to North Korea from 1957 to 1962, to Yugoslavia from 1962 to 1967, to Bulgaria from 1967 to 1972 and to Afghanistan from 1972 to 1979.  

1906 births
1998 deaths
Central Committee of the Communist Party of the Soviet Union members
Politburo of the Central Committee of the Communist Party of the Soviet Union members
Russian communists
Heads of government of the Russian Soviet Federative Socialist Republic
Politicians from Moscow
Ambassadors of the Soviet Union to Afghanistan
Ambassadors of the Soviet Union to Bulgaria
Ambassadors of the Soviet Union to Yugoslavia
Ambassadors of the Soviet Union to North Korea
Burials at Vagankovo Cemetery